is a passenger railway station in the town of Hokota, Ibaraki Prefecture, Japan operated by the third sector Kashima Rinkai Railway.

Lines
Hinuma Station is served by the Ōarai Kashima Line, and is located 18.0 km from the official starting point of the line at Mito Station.

Station layout
The station consists of a single elevated side platform serving traffic in both directions. The station is unattended.

History
Hinuma Station was opened on 14 March 1985 with the opening of the Ōarai Kashima Line.

Passenger statistics
In fiscal 2015, the station was used by an average of 256 passengers daily.

Surrounding area
 Lake Hinuma

See also
 List of railway stations in Japan

References

External links

 Kashima Rinkai Testudo Station Information 

Railway stations in Ibaraki Prefecture
Railway stations in Japan opened in 1985
Hokota, Ibaraki